Thrombophlebitis is a phlebitis (inflammation of a vein) related to a thrombus (blood clot). When it occurs repeatedly in different locations, it is known as thrombophlebitis migrans (migratory thrombophlebitis).

Signs and symptoms
The following symptoms or signs are often associated with thrombophlebitis, although thrombophlebitis is not restricted to the veins of the legs.

 Pain (area affected)
 Skin redness/inflammation
 Edema
 Veins hard and cord-like
 Tenderness

Complications
In terms of complications, one of the most serious occurs when the superficial blood clot is associated with a deep vein thrombosis; this can then dislodge, traveling through the heart and occluding the dense capillary network of the lungs This is a pulmonary embolism which can be life-threatening.

Causes

Thrombophlebitis causes include disorders related to increased tendency for blood clotting and reduced speed of blood in the veins such as prolonged immobility; prolonged traveling (sitting) may promote a blood clot leading to thrombophlebitis but this occurs relatively less. High estrogen states such as pregnancy, estrogen replacement therapy, or oral contraceptives are associated with an increased risk of thrombophlebitis.

Specific disorders associated with thrombophlebitis include superficial thrombophlebitis which affects veins near the skin surface, deep vein thrombosis which affects deeper veins, and pulmonary embolism.

Those with familial clotting disorders such as protein S deficiency, protein C deficiency, or factor V Leiden are also at increased risk of thrombophlebitis. Thrombophlebitis can be found in people with vasculitis including Behçet's disease. Thrombophlebitis migrans can be a sign of malignancy – Trousseau sign of malignancy.

Diagnosis
The diagnosis for thrombophlebitis is primarily based on the appearance of the affected area. Frequent checks of the pulse, blood pressure, and temperature may be required. If the cause is not readily identifiable, tests may be performed to determine the cause, including the following:
 Doppler ultrasound
 Extremity arteriography
 Blood coagulation studies (Blood clotting tests)

Prevention
Prevention consists of walking, drinking fluids and if currently hospitalized, changing of IV lines. Walking is especially suggested after a long period seated, particularly when one travels.

Treatment

In terms of treatment for this condition the individual may be advised to do the following: raise the affected area to decrease swelling, and relieve  pressure off of the affected area so it will encounter less pain. In certain circumstances drainage of the clot might be an option. In general, treatment may include the following:

Epidemiology
Thrombophlebitis occurs almost equally between women and men, though males do have a slightly higher possibility. The average age of developing thrombophlebitis, based on analyzed incidents, is 54 for men and 58 for women.

See also
 Mondor's disease
 Phlebothrombosis

References

Further reading

External links 

Vascular diseases
Inflammations
Diseases of veins, lymphatic vessels and lymph nodes